The men's 400 metres hurdles event at the 2019 African Games was held on 28 and 29 August in Rabat.

Medalists

Results

Heats
Qualification: First 2 in each heat (Q) and the next 2 fastest (q) advanced to the final.

Final

References

400
African Games